Weziwe Tikana (born 3 November 1967) is a South African politician, educator and trade unionist. She was the Eastern Cape MEC for Transport, Safety and Liaison from 2014 until 2022. She has been a member of the Eastern Cape Provincial Legislature since 2014. Tikana is a member of the African National Congress.

Early life and education
Tikana was born in Cala in the former Cape Province (now the Eastern Cape). She matriculated from Sewushe Commercial College. She completed a teachers' course at Arthur Tsengiwe College of Education. Tikana holds a primary teachers' diploma from Belgravia Institute and a diploma in local government Management from the University of Pretoria. Tikana earned a diploma in labour law from Global Business Solution.

Career 
Tikana worked as an educator and training officer at the Department of Education and the Xhalanga Entrepreneurial Development Centre. She was also an adult basic education supervisor at the Cala Guidance Centre. She was also a senior administration officer at the Emalahleni Local Municipality and was employed as a director of municipal public participation at the Local Government and Traditional Affairs Department. Tikana also served on the Vukani Community Radio Station board.

Politics
Tikana is a member of the African National Congress and the party's women's league and serves on both organisations' provincial executive committees. Tikana also served on the structures of the South African Democratic Teachers Union and the Xhalanga Youth Congress.

Tikana served on the regional executive committee of the ANC's women's league in the former Engcobo Region and was a member of the inter-regional structure of the former Ngcobo, Queenstown and mid-Karoo region. She also served as treasurer of the ANC's Chris Hani region.

Tikana is a former mayor of Sakhisizwe Local Municipality in the Chris Hani District Municipality and former South African Democratic Teachers Union deputy chair. She was a member of the SALGA management committee and served as the chairperson of the Governance Sub-Committee of the organisation.

Provincial government
In 2014 Tikana was elected as a member of the Eastern Cape Provincial Legislature. She was then appointed as the Member of the Executive Council (MEC) for Transport, Safety and Liaison by premier Phumulo Masualle. Tikana was re-elected to another term in the legislature in 2019. She remained in her position as MEC for Transport, Safety and Liaison following Oscar Mabuyane's election as premier. She is the only member of Masualle's executive to be appointed to Mabuyane's executive.

In June 2020, Tikana lost a court case in which she wanted the United Democratic Movement (UDM) leader, Bantu Holomisa to retract a tweet raising concerns over a guest house, which is in her daughter's name, that the provincial government decided to use a COVID-19 isolation facility. Judge Gerald Bloem found it likely that Tikana was the owner or held a benefit in the Mioca Lodge in Cala.

In March 2021, acting Public Protector Kholeka Gcaleka found that there was no improper conduct by Tikana in relation to the procurement of her daughter's lodge as a COVID-19 quarantine site.

On 16 August 2022, Mabuyane reshuffled his executive council and removed Tikana as the MEC for Transport, Safety and Liaison due to her support for Babalo Madikizela, his contender for provincial chairperson at the ANC's provincial elective conference in May 2022.

References

External links

Living people
1967 births
Xhosa people
People from the Eastern Cape
African National Congress politicians
Members of the Eastern Cape Provincial Legislature
Women members of provincial legislatures of South Africa